Acinetobacter schindleri is a species of bacteria. It is potentially pathogenic. Its type strain is LUH 5832T (= NIPH 1034T = LMG 19576T = CNCTC 6736T).

References

Further reading

External links
Type strain of Acinetobacter schindleri at BacDive -  the Bacterial Diversity Metadatabase

Moraxellaceae
Bacteria described in 2001